Watson High School Madhubani is a high school located in Madhubani, Bihar, India. It was established in 1901 by A. W. Watson, who was Sub-Divisional Officer in Madhubani from November 1900 to April 1903.

The school is affiliated to BSEB, Patna, and offers schooling from IX to Class XII. 

Renamed as :  Suraj Narayan Singh Dev Narayan Gurmaita Boys High School after 1997.

Campus
Watson School is located at a highly visible site on Madhubani-Darbhanga highway .

Alumni
 Dr. Ranjeet Kumar Jha (Ph.D., USA) (2004, Xth School Test Topper; Currently working at IIT Bombay)
Md Abid Equbal (B tech civil engineering NITRR)
(2016,Xth passed)
Currently Study NATIONAL INSTITUTE OF TECHNOLOGY RAIPUR
 Dr. S.P. Narayan (PhD IISC, BANGALORE)
(1965-1966, IX & IX special)
Former Chief Scientist at CSIR-AMPRI, Bhopal since 1987 to 2013.

Notes

Madhubani district
High schools and secondary schools in Bihar
Educational institutions established in 1901
1901 establishments in India